East China University of Technology (ECUT), is a public university located in Nanchang, Jiangxi. It was the first university in China's nuclear industry.

ECUT is the pilot university of the Outstanding Engineer Education and Training Programme of the Ministry of Education, the Plan 111 of the Ministry of Education, the Basic Capacity Building Project of Colleges and Universities in the Central and Western regions to support universities, and the New Engineering research and practise projects to be selected in colleges and universities.

History 
ECUT, originally established in 1956 in Shanxi Province. It started as Taigu Geological School. It belonged to State Second Mechanic Industry, a state defence institution.

It was jointly built by the People's Government of Jiangxi Province, the State Administration of National Defence Science, Technology and Industry, the Ministry of Natural Resources, and the China Nuclear Industry Corporation.

In 1958, ECUT moved to Fuzhou, Jiangxi Province due to the abundant uranium deposits, and later to Nanchang.

Presently, ECUT is jointly run by the Jiangxi Government and China Atomic Energy Association (CAEA), the Ministry of Natural Resource (MNR), China National Nuclear Corporation (CNNC).

Curriculum 

From its inception, ECUT has focused on the fields of nuclear science and geoscience and expanded to engineering, science, language, economy, and arts. ECUT offers one doctoral programme, 71 master programmes, and 68 bachelor programmes. Most of these disciplines are connected to the traditional fields at ECUT, forming more than 20 schools and research centres.

Since its establishment, ECUT has focused its education and research in the field of Nuclear Science and Geology Science, with the relevant disciplines, developed gradually. Based on the featured disciplines ECUT has developed into the fields of Geological Tourism, Geological Economy, Geological Chemistry, and Geological Environment etc. So far, ECUT has extended its education and research to engineering, science, language, management, economy and arts, among which 1 doctoral programme, 71 master programmes and 72 bachelor programmes, forming more than 20 schools and research centres.

Students and staff 
ECUT has a team of 2,800 teachers as its full-time staff, including 123 professors. Around 23,000 students study on the campuses. ECUT enrols international students, including doctoral programmes, master programmes, and bachelor programmes.

Leaders and notable alumni 

 Qian Qihu, Honorary Principal
 Xu Yuejin, Secretary of the Party Committee
Liu Hesheng, Secretary of the Party Committee
 Sun Zhanxue, Principal, Deputy Secretary of the Party Committee
 Liu Zichun, Deputy Secretary of the Party Committee
 Liu Xiaodong, Vice principal
Tang Bin, Vice principal
Guo Fusheng, Vice principal
Chen Xiaoyong, Vice principal
Nie Fengjun, Vice principal
Li Deping, Vice principal
Chen Huanwen, Vice principal
 Wan Jifeng, Secretary of the Discipline Inspection Commission
 Zeng Jiehua, Deputy Secretary of the Discipline Inspection Commission
 Gong Jianya, Academician of the Chinese Academy of Sciences (CAS)
Wang Yaonan(), Academician of Chinese Academy of Engineering(CAE)

Faculties 

 School of Earth Science
 School of Nuclear Science and Technology
 School of Geophysics and Measurement and Control Technology
 School of Chemistry, Biology and Material Science
 School of Water Resources and Environmental Engineering
 School of Geomatics
School of Civil and Architectural Engineering
 School of Information Engineering
 School of Software Engineering
 School of Mechanical and Electronic Engineering
 School of Economics and Management
 School of Literature and Law
 School of Foreign Languages
 School of Science
 School of Marxism
 School of Teacher Training
 School of Physical Education
 School of Vocational Education
 School of Postgraduate Education
 Jiangxi Key Laboratory of Nuclear Resources and Environment
 Jiangxi Key Laboratory of Mass Spectrometry and Instrumentation
 International School

Research environment 
ECUT has more than ten national and provincial laboratories: the State Key Laboratory of Nuclear Resources and the Environment, the National Defence Key Discipline Laboratory of Radioactive Geology and Exploration Technology, the Science Ministry's International Cooperation Base of Earth Environment, the Education Ministry's Engineering Research Centre for Nuclear Technology, the Reference Laboratory of IAEA and the National Experimental Teaching Demonstration Centre for Radioactive Geology. In addition, two training centres, the Uranium Geology and Isotope Hydrology Advanced Training Centre of IAEA, and the Overseas Uranium Resources Exploration are present.

Campus 
ECUT has two campuses, located in Nanchang and Fuzhou. The main campus is situated in Nanchang, the capital of Jiangxi province. The other campus, approximately 80 km southeast of Nanchang, is in Fuzhou. The two campuses occupy an area of 1400 km2.

See also 

 List of universities in China
 List of universities and colleges in Jiangxi

References

External links 

 ECUT Official Website in English
 East China University of Technology Official Website (Chinese)
 Introduction to East China University of Technology
 ResearchGate - East China University of Technology

 
Universities and colleges in Jiangxi
1956 establishments in China
Fuzhou, Jiangxi